Tere Liye may refer to:

Tere Liye (film), 2001 film
Tere Liye (TV series), an Indian television drama series
Tere Liye (Atif Aslam song), a song from Prince (2010 film)